Craig Smart (born 23 March 1975) is a Scottish footballer who played as a midfielder for Livingston.

Club career
He started his career in the youth ranks of Dunfermline, but failed to make a single first team appearance for the club.

In 1995, Smart signed for Livingston who had just renamed and relocated to West Lothian.  He was part of the side that won the 1995–96 Scottish Third Division.  The midfielder appeared 48 times for Livi before leaving the club in 1997.    

Smart left Scotland in 1997 to sign for Newry City F.C. in Northern Ireland.  The spell lasted just a season before he returned to Scotland to sign for Brechin City F.C..

After leaving the City, Smart signed for Hill of Beath Hawthorn.

International career
Smart received an offer of a call up to the India national football team in 1996.  He was eligible to represent the Blue Tigers as his grandfather was born in India.  He did not accept the offer to represent India.

Honours
Livingston
Scottish Third Division: 1995-96

References

External links
Craig Smart on Soccerbase

1975 births
Living people
Scottish footballers
Scottish Football League players
Association football defenders
Livingston F.C. players
Dunfermline Athletic F.C. players
Brechin City F.C. players
Newry City A.F.C. players
Hill of Beath Hawthorn F.C. players
Footballers from Dunfermline